is a Japanese video game development and localization company specializing in role-playing video games, visual novels and adventure games. The company was founded in 1984 as Chunsoft Co., Ltd. and merged with Spike in 2012. It is owned by Dwango.

They created games such as the first five Dragon Quest installments and the Mystery Dungeon franchise as Chunsoft, and the Conception series as Spike Chunsoft. They also developed titles such as The Portopia Serial Murder Case, the Sound Novel series (consisting of Otogirisō, Kamaitachi no Yoru, Machi and 428: Shibuya Scramble) and the Zero Escape series as Chunsoft. Spike developed Danganronpa before the merger.

History

Chunsoft 
Chunsoft was founded by Koichi Nakamura, a video game designer and programmer who had worked with Enix, including the popular Dragon Quest franchise until Dragon Quest V. The "Chun" in the company name is from the first kanji Naka (中) of the company founder's name; Naka is read as "Chun" in Japanese Mahjong. This name would also appear in Nakamura's first work with Enix, titled Door Door in 1983. Otogirisō marked Chunsoft's debut brand. Following that, successive genre-trailblazing titles Torneko no Daibōken: Fushigi no Dungeon, Kamaitachi no Yoru, and Shiren the Wanderer established the company's good reputation. Nakamura himself had to move away from programming in order to run the company.

For a time, the company's products were considered mediocre, but 3-Nen B-Gumi Kinpachi Sensei: Densetsu no Kyoudan ni Tate! was a hit that showed signs of recovery. During the development of Pokémon Mystery Dungeon: Red Rescue Team and Blue Rescue Team, Kouji Maruta, one of the programmers for these two games, and contributed previously on EarthBound and Shiren the Wanderer 2, stated the company went through bad business performance, as employees from Chunsoft would leave the company progressively due to this issue. The game's success not only helped giving more popularity in the Mystery Dungeon franchise, it also helped Chunsoft from avoiding bankruptcy. Later in 2005, it was bought by Dwango and became a subsidiary of the company.

Before the project, Sega were helping Chunsoft in developing and releasing their games for the Dreamcast. From 2005 to 2010, Sega have made a collaboration with Chunsoft titled "SEGA×CHUN PROJECT". Their goal was to provide support and sales for development funds, such as the Nintendo DS remake of Mystery Dungeon: Shiren the Wanderer or 428: Shibuya Scramble.

Spike

Merger 
In 2012, Chunsoft merged with its sister company Spike and the new company would be called Spike Chunsoft.

Subsidiary 
In 2017, Spike Chunsoft established a North American subsidiary based in Long Beach, California to carry out localization and publishing of its own games, in addition to games by its sister company 5pb./Mages under a newly formed partnership. Their first game under the Mages partnership was the Microsoft Windows version of Steins;Gate, taking over publishing of the game from Mages in 2018; they have since continued publishing further games in the Science Adventure series, including Steins;Gate 0 and Chaos;Child.

On July 16, 2020, NIS America announced that Danganronpa games on the Playstation Store will be removed. Spike Chunsoft subsequently announced on July 22, 2020 that they will take on publishing the Danganronpa series outside of Japan. Similarly, the Nintendo Switch and Microsoft Windows release of Shiren the Wanderer: The Tower of Fortune and the Dice of Fate would not be released by Aksys but by their subsidiary.

Titles

Chunsoft

Published and/or developed

Developed only

Spike Chunsoft

Published and/or developed

Developed only

Published western third-party games in Japan

Published internationally by Spike Chunsoft, Inc. 
This table lists video games published internationally by Spike Chunsoft's American subsidiary Spike Chunsoft, Inc. since its foundation on December 1, 2017. Outside of titles from Spike Chunsoft in Japan, the company publishes titles from Mages (which was also part of Spike Chunsoft's parent company Dwango until July 2019) and from other companies.

Notes

References

External links 
 

 
Video game companies of Japan
Video game development companies
Video game publishers
Video game companies established in 1984
Kadokawa Corporation subsidiaries
Japanese companies established in 1984
Mystery Dungeon
Software companies based in Tokyo